The 1906 East Tyrone by-election was held on 5 July 1906.  The by-election was held due to the death of the incumbent Irish Parliamentary MP, Patrick Doogan.  It was won by 18 votes by the Irish Parliamentary candidate Tom Kettle.

References

1906 elections in the United Kingdom
By-elections to the Parliament of the United Kingdom in County Tyrone constituencies
20th century in County Tyrone
1906 elections in Ireland